Anselmo "Jair" Ribeiro (born December 17, 1974) is a retired Cape Verdean soccer player.

Career

Youth
Jair emigrated from his native Cape Verde to the United States as a child, settling with his family in suburban Boston. He attended Madison Park High School in Roxbury, Massachusetts

Professional
Jair began his professional career in Portugal, with the reserves of Sporting CP, although he never played a first team game with the team, and spent a great deal of time on loan at Portuguese second division clubs Alverca and Olhanense.

After two years with CSKA Sofia in Bulgaria, Jair signed with New England Revolution in March 1998, and became a starter in the team's midfield. He transferred to San Jose Clash in the middle of the 1999 season in exchange for Jeff Baicher, having played 29 games and scored 4 goals for Revolution, a move which sparked concerns about possible conflicts of interest within the league.

After a year with the Hampton Roads Mariners in the A-League, and a short three-month stay at one of his old clubs in Portugal, Olhanense, Jair moved to Florida to play for Tampa Bay Mutiny in 2001, ultimately playing 25 games for the team prior to its demise at the end of the season.

Jair spent two more years playing competitively, with Connecticut Wolves in the A-League in 2002, and with Western Mass Pioneers in the USL Pro Soccer League in 2003, before retiring from the sport in 2004.

International
Jair has played with the Cape Verde national football team, appearing in World Cup qualifiers in 2000 against Algeria.

Personal
Jair's nickname was inspired by the legendary Brazilian player Jair da Rosa Pinto, who is best remembered for his performance in Brazil's 1950 FIFA World Cup campaign.

Post-Soccer Career
Jair currently resides in Florida.

References

External links
Player Profile at ForaDeJogo

1974 births
Living people
Cape Verdean footballers
Cape Verdean expatriates in the United States
Cape Verde international footballers
Sporting CP footballers
S.C. Olhanense players
PFC CSKA Sofia players
San Jose Earthquakes players
New England Revolution players
Virginia Beach Mariners players
Tampa Bay Mutiny players
Connecticut Wolves players
Western Mass Pioneers players
UConn Huskies men's soccer players
Expatriate footballers in Bulgaria
Expatriate soccer players in the United States
First Professional Football League (Bulgaria) players
Major League Soccer players
Association football forwards
Association football midfielders
People from Roxbury, Boston
Soccer players from Boston